A penumbral lunar eclipse took place on Sunday, January 31, 1999, the first of two lunar eclipses in 1999.

This was a relatively rare total penumbral lunar eclipse with the moon passing entirely within the penumbral shadow without entering the darker umbral shadow.

Visibility

Images 

This simulated view compares this penumbral eclipse (left) to the full moon (right) as it appeared an hour before the eclipse.

Related lunar eclipses

Eclipses of 1999 
 A penumbral lunar eclipse on January 31.
 An annular solar eclipse on February 16.
 A partial lunar eclipse on July 28.
 A total solar eclipse on August 11.

Lunar year series

Saros series
Lunar Saros series 114, repeating every 18 years and 11 days, has a total of 71 lunar eclipse events including 13 total lunar eclipses.

First Penumbral Lunar Eclipse: 0971 May 13

First Partial Lunar Eclipse: 1115 Aug 07

First Total Lunar Eclipse: 1458 Feb 28

First Central Lunar Eclipse: 1530 Apr 12

Greatest Eclipse of Lunar Saros 114: 1584 May 24

Last Central Lunar Eclipse: 1638 Jun 26

Last Total Lunar Eclipse: 1674 Jul 17

Last Partial Lunar Eclipse: 1890 Nov 26

Last Penumbral Lunar Eclipse: 2233 Jun 22

Half-Saros cycle
A lunar eclipse will be preceded and followed by solar eclipses by 9 years and 5.5 days (a half saros). This lunar eclipse is related to two annular solar eclipses of Solar Saros 121.

See also 
List of lunar eclipses
List of 20th-century lunar eclipses

Notes

External links 
 
 Saros cycle 114

1999-01
1999-01
1999 in science
January 1999 events